Xinyuan Nalati Airport  is an airport that mainly serves tourists to the Nalati scenic area in Xinjiang Uyghur Autonomous Region, China.  The airport is located 58 kilometers from Nalati and 12 kilometers from Xinyuan County (Künes County) in Ili Kazakh Autonomous Prefecture.  The airport was opened in 2005.

Airlines and destinations

See also
List of airports in China
List of the busiest airports in China

References

Airports in Xinjiang
Airports established in 2005
2005 establishments in China
Ili Kazakh Autonomous Prefecture